Benjamin Brown was a professional baseball shortstop in the Negro leagues. He played with the Newark Browns and Bacharach Giants in 1932.

References

External links
 and Baseball-Reference Black Baseball stats and Seamheads

Bacharach Giants players
Newark Browns players
Year of birth missing
Year of death missing
Baseball shortstops